ABC Television in Brisbane comprises national programming on the ABC television network in or from Brisbane, Queensland which broadcasts on a number of channels under the ABC call sign. There is some local programming from the Brisbane  studio.

ABQ was the historic name for the Australian Broadcasting Corporation's television station in Brisbane, which began broadcasting on 2 November 1959, with the "Q" in the call sign standing for Queensland.

ABC Television in Brisbane is based at purpose-built headquarters on the South Bank. The station is received throughout the state through a number of relay transmitters.

History

ABC Television started broadcasting from Brisbane on  2 November 1959, with the "Q" in the call sign standing for Queensland.

Available by satellite transmission on the now defunct Optus Aurora free-to-view platform during the 2000s, ABC's digital channels have been available via the Viewer Access Satellite Television (VAST) network since 2010.

For many years, the station was based at studios in the inner-western suburb of Toowong, with a transmitter at Mount Coot-tha. In December 2006, the Toowong studios were closed after an unacceptably high rate of breast cancer has been observed at the facility.  An independent study examined 10 cases of breast cancer reported at the studios, and found the incidence rate was 11 times higher than the general working community.  led to the closure of the site in December 2006, TV and radio operations were moved to alternative locations around the city.

Staff worked from several sites around Brisbane, with ABC Radio based in nearby Lissner Street in Toowong, ABC News staff working from Network Ten's Mount Coot-tha studios, ABC Innovation and Online staff working at QUT Kelvin Grove, and other staff based in other locations, including Coronation Drive and West End. On 10 January 2012, ABC Brisbane moved into new purpose-built accommodation in South Bank.

The analogue signal for Brisbane/Gold Coast/Sunshine Coast was shut off on May 28, 2013.

ABC Television in Brisbane today

All ABC operations are located in the South Bank building.   there is a large number of transmitters broadcasting a number of ABC channels throughout Queensland.

Programming

ABC Television in Brisbane schedule largely consists of national programming with opt-outs for news and current affairs, rugby league and state election coverage.

Local programming
ABC News Queensland is presented by Matt Wordsworth (Monday - Thursday) and Jessica van Vonderen (Friday – Sunday). Weather is presented by Jenny Woodward (Monday – Friday) and Craig Zonca (Sunday). Finance is presented by Alan Kohler in Melbourne.

Past presenters of the bulletin have included Rod Young and Andrew Lofthouse, both of whom went on to read the flagship 6:00 pm bulletins on Seven and Nine respectively. The pair opposed each other in this timeslot between mid-2009 and late-2012, during which the Seven bulletin co-read by Young and Kay McGrath consistently rated higher than the Nine bulletin co-read by Lofthouse and Melissa Downes (as of 2017, however, Nine has regained the lead in the south-east Queensland ratings).

Relay stations
The following stations relayed ABQ throughout Queensland:

Notes:
1. HAAT estimated from http://www.itu.int/SRTM3/ using EHAAT.
2. ABDQ was on VHF channel 3 from its 1963 sign-on until 1993, moving to its current channel in order to accommodate FM radio.
3. ABMQ was on VHF channel 4 from its 1967 sign-on until 1988, moving to its current channel in order to accommodate FM radio.
4. ABRQ was on VHF channel 3 from its 1963 sign-on until 1988, moving to its current channel in order to accommodate FM radio.
5. ABSEQ was on VHF channel 9 from its 1974 sign-on until 1989.

Mary Kathleen also had a relay station (ABMKQ channel 9) from 15 December 1971 until the town was abandoned ca. 1982.

See also
History of the Australian Broadcasting Corporation
Television broadcasting in Australia

References

Television stations in Brisbane
Television channels and stations established in 1959
1959 establishments in Australia
Australian Broadcasting Corporation television stations